Schutz Lake is a lake in Carver County, Minnesota, in the United States.

Schutz Lake was named for Matthias Schutz, a pioneer who settled near this lake.

References

Lakes of Minnesota
Lakes of Carver County, Minnesota